Telmatogeton japonicus is a species of midge in the family Chironomidae. It is native to Japan and introduced to North America and Europe.

References

Further reading

External links

 

Chironomidae
Articles created by Qbugbot
Insects described in 1933